The Buried Pyramid (also called the Pyramid of Sekhemkhet) is an unfinished step pyramid constructed c. 2645 BC for Sekhemkhet Djoserty. He was the second pharaoh of the Third Dynasty of Ancient Egypt, which reigned over Egypt circa 2686–2613 BC and is usually placed at the beginning of the Old Kingdom of Egypt. Many historians believe that the third dynasty played an important role in the transition from Early Dynastic Period of Egypt to the Age of the Pyramids.

The pyramid may be visited, but the public is not allowed access to the base and substructures.

Sekhemkhet Djoserty was also the successor to the better-known pharaoh Djoser, who was buried in his famous step pyramid at Saqqara. The buried pyramid was originally modelled after Djoser's step pyramid and is located several hundred metres southwest. It is also arguable that the pyramid of Sekhemkhet was originally designed to surpass the step pyramid of Djoser but barely made it above ground level and hence was given the name the Buried Pyramid. Its incompletion is thought to have been due to Sekhemkhet's short reign as ruler, which was approximately six years.

History
 
The Buried Pyramid was a previously unknown structure until, in 1951, Egyptologist Zakaria Goneim noticed the odd rectangular shape in the desert while excavating the nearby Unas complex.

The pyramid itself was located at the centre of the complex, with a base length of 115 m (377 ft), it had only one step and was unfinished. During the next stage of excavation, Goneim discovered a descending passage to the north side which led to a gallery blocked with rubble and masonry. There were a number of objects found during the excavation of this gallery including animal bones, demotic papyri, and Third Dynasty stone vessels. In a decayed wooden casket, gold was discovered which included gold bracelets, cosmetic cases, beads, and jars inscribed with Sekhemkhet's name.

When the blocked wall was breached, on May 31, 1954, an unfinished and undecorated burial chamber was discovered. Inside it, lay an alabaster sarcophagus cut from a single block with a vertical lid which seemed to still be sealed. However, on June 26, 1954, after great difficulties to unblock and raise the lid, the sarcophagus was opened and to everyone's disappointment, it was empty.

Criticism of Goneim and his subsequent apparent suicide on January 12, 1959 dampened the interest in the pyramid and investigation was left incomplete.

In 1963, the excavation was re-opened by Jean-Philippe Lauer due to the possibility of a south tomb and his desire to find the missing mummy. Lauer did indeed find a partially destroyed tomb under the southern side that at some point had been looted by robbers.  He found a wooden coffin with the remains of an unidentified two-year-old child and gold leaf fragments.

The complex

Sekhemkhet's pyramid complex was built southwest of Djoser's at Saqqara, and it includes a pyramid, a subterranean structure, and a necropolis complex.

The name Imhotep appears on a section of the complex's enclosure wall. While the name itself contains no titles and thus it is uncertain if this is the same architect that planned Djoser's Step Pyramid, the line of succession and similar architectural features suggest such a possibility.

Pyramid
The ancient name of Sekhemkhet's pyramid is unknown; however, it is colloquially known as Buried Pyramid due to its unfinished nature as well as it being previously unknown until its discovery in 1952, when it was found beneath the sands. Its present state is more similar to a mastaba, only reaching 2.43 m (8 ft) of height. The pyramid's foundations stand upon an uneven rock surface, leading the builders to try to level the terrain by building terraces, some reaching ten metres high.

The pyramid was to be stepped right from its inception.

As the pyramid was unfinished, it never received its limestone casing, but the construction technique can be still be made out: the limestone blocks are inclined inwards by 15°, with sloping courses of stone laid at right angles to the incline.

Substructure
The entrance to the subterranean structure lies to the north, starting with a narrow passage that descends for about  until meeting a vertical shaft from the top of the corridor. At this spot, another passage leads down to a row of 136 unfinished galleries which forms a U shape around the pyramid. Two further such magazine galleries appear right before the entrance to the burial chamber with a similar disposition, like their counterparts, they were never finished.

It was also left unfinished, yet it contained a complete burial arrangement. The sarcophagus is cut from a single block of fine alabaster; its lid was vertical, slid into place and held at the front face by means of mortar sealing.

Necropolis complex
The complex is oriented with a north-south axis, but with an accuracy deviation of about 11°.
One notable feature of this complex is an inner wall known as "White Wall" made out of limestone covered with red mason's lines and graffiti.

It remain unknown whether Sekhemkhet's complex would include any mortuary temples or other features also found in Djoser's complex. Its unfinished state presents difficulty for such conjectures.

The actual entrance to the complex is unknown.

South Tomb
In 1963, J. P. Lauer found, offset from the center to west axis of the pyramid and under a mastaba-like structure with dimensions , the foundations of the so-called South Tomb. It stands closer to the pyramid itself than in the complex of his predecessor.

In the substructure of the mastaba, following a passage accessed by a vertical shaft, the excavators unearthed a chamber where they found a wooden coffin with the remains of an unidentified two-year-old child. It is certain the child is not Sekhemkhet himself, since he is represented as an adult in reliefs from Wadi Maghara in Sinai. Also found were animal bones, stone vessels and gold jewelry from the Third Dynasty, as well as traces of a robbery of the tomb.

Enclosure wall
The enclosure walls had a niches similar to the one on the walls of the Djoser complex, and was clad with Tura limestone that has been preserved in the first north wall, as they had been filled with the extension. The walls were about ten meters high. Work on the extension walls may have been halted during the first stages of construction, or else their Tura limestone casing was later stolen.

See also 
 List of Egyptian pyramids

References

Ancient Egyptian step pyramids
Pyramids of the Third Dynasty of Egypt
Saqqara